Vladimir Luxuria, born 24 June 1965, is an Italian activist, television personality and actress. Luxuria was a Communist Refoundation Party MP, belonging to The Union coalition led by Romano Prodi.

She was the first openly transgender member of Parliament in Europe, and the world's second openly transgender MP after New Zealander Georgina Beyer. She lost her seat in the election of April 2008.

In the 2006 general election, Luxuria was elected to the Chamber of Deputies by the Lazio 1 constituency in Rome. She lost her seat in the 2008 election. After the retirement of Beyer and Luxuria, there were no transgender MPs reported in the world, until 2011, when Anna Grodzka was elected to the Polish parliament.

Biography

Born in Foggia, Apulia, Luxuria moved to Rome in 1985 to study foreign languages and literature. She also began to act, notably in cabaret, and through this developed her gender ambiguity as a hallmark. Her assumed surname, Luxuria, means lust in Latin. She earned her first acting credit in Cena alle nove by Paolo Breccia in 1991; and began organizing parties and gay pride events, becoming director of the Muccassassina, the self-financing party of the Circle of homosexual culture Mario Mieli. She graduated in foreign languages and literatures at University of Rome La Sapienza with a master thesis on Joseph Conrad.

She organized Italy's first pride festival, in Rome on 2 June 1994, which attracted some ten thousand people. From 2001 to 2003 she toured Italian theatres with the musical Emotions co-starring with Sabrina Salerno and Ambra Angiolini.

Her career as performer was not restricted to stage shows, and in 2005 she hosted a television show about nostalgia for 1980s music and culture on All Music. She also became well known for participating in charity organizations before making the transition to politics.

Luxuria identifies using the English word "transgender" and prefers feminine pronouns, titles, and adjectives. She has stated on occasion that she perceives herself as neither male nor female. Upon entering parliament, she made the decision to stop wearing her trademark drag clothing – an extravagant cocktail of sequins, feather boas and bouffant wigs – saying that the legislature was "not a discothèque" and that, "It wouldn't be useful to provoke [people] in such a stupid way."

After her bid for re-election failed in April 2008, Luxuria appeared on L'Isola dei Famosi, which has been described as "Italy's celebrity answer to Survivor." The show, which saw her pip Argentine model and showgirl Belen Rodriguez (former girlfriend of Italy footballer Marco Borriello) to first place in a public poll, took place in Honduras. Luxuria said of her victory that "The Italian public has shown itself to be more forward-looking than our politicians, who thought I would turn up in parliament dressed like (former porn-star politician) Cicciolina." Pledging to donate half of her €200,000 prize-money to charity, Luxuria chose UNICEF, saying "I know that I won't have children and I want to help disadvantaged children in my own way."

She was chosen to host the 2012 edition of the Italian TV program L'Isola dei Famosi, on RaiDue.

In 2017, in an interview with Mauro Leonardi for an Italian weekly (Novella 2000), told for the first time her conversion to Catholicism. The interview has aroused media hype and, during a broadcast on Rai1, she reiterated the content of her statements, as well as in an interview in 2022.

Political life

Election in 2006

Although her Lazio 1 constituency was seen as a safe Communist seat, her election was not without difficulties, particularly after it was disclosed that she had been a sex worker for a time shortly after arriving in Rome due to the difficulty of finding a conventional job as a transgender individual. Clemente Mastella, the leader of the centrist UDEUR party (a fellow member of the coalition) called her "a ridiculous Cicciolina." Alessandra Mussolini, said, referring to Luxuria, that it was "better to be a fascist than a faggot" (meglio fascista che frocio). However, Luxuria's name was placed second on the list of Communist candidates for Lazio, after party leader Fausto Bertinotti, which increased her chances of being elected (Italy uses a system of proportional representation).

During the election, she and another candidate were attacked by a group of fifteen people, allegedly including National Alliance politicians; they pelted her with fennel (in Italian finocchio, a word also meaning "faggot"). The politicians in question were suspended by AN; Luxuria criticized the police for the time it took for them to respond to the incident.

Service
Her service in the Italian parliament got off to a rocky start, when in October 2006 Forza Italia MP Elisabetta Gardini insisted that she should not be allowed to use women's washrooms in the parliament building and called for the creation of a third washroom. Gardini described finding Luxuria presence there as a "sexual violence"; and later faced condemnations from coalition deputies for displaying prejudice tantamount to racism. Luxuria declared that she had used the toilets for years and that using the male lavatory would engender even greater problems.

In the 2008 election, the Refoundation Communist Party joined a coalition of left-wing parties known as the Rainbow Left. However this group gained only 3.2% of the vote and lost all of its seats in parliament. Silvio Berlusconi's centre-right coalition swept to victory. Luxuria was not re-elected. Paolo Ferrero, then leader of the Communist Refoundation Party, said that he would be open to the idea of her returning to politics as a nominee for the 2009 European Parliament election after her win on L'Isola dei Famosi, but Luxuria said that she had no plans to re-enter politics.

Gay rights
Luxuria has long been a strong advocate for gay rights and a participant in events promoting equality for homosexuals. She helped organize Italy's first gay pride festival in 1994 and continued her activism throughout her tenure as a politician; in May 2007, she took part in the second Muscovite gay pride parade.

She used her prominence in Italian politics once elected as a platform for advocating gay rights. In the lead-up to her election, Luxuria made gay rights an issue of her campaign and felt herself to be a representative of the LGBT community, saying, "We don't want privileges – we want our rights." In addition, Luxuria called for civil unions to be enabled for gay couples and for Italy to accommodate political asylum for "all gays who try to get into Italy from countries where homosexuality is punishable by death."

Luxuria also campaigned prior to the elections for gays to have cohabitation rights, and had helped campaign by winning the support of Italy's left. Furthermore, Luxuria outlined her long-term support for full gay marriage rights, comparable with Spain's implementation of the law. In September 2006, she stated that the Vatican's ongoing influence in politics, specifically in regards to gay marriage, contravened clauses of the Italian Constitution. Luxuria reacted to Pope Benedict XVI's end-of-year speech in 2008, when he compared protecting the environment with saving humanity from a "blurring of gender" (homosexual or transsexual behaviour), by saying that such comments were "hurtful".

Filmography

Films

Television

Theater
 Emozioni (2001–2003)
 Che fine ha fatto Cenerentola? (2003)
 One Drag Show (2003)
 Male di Luna (2004)
 My name is Silvia (2005)
 Persone naturali e strafottenti (2010)
 La donna uomo (2010)
 Morning has broken - Una vita spezzata (2010)
 Si sdrai perfavore (2011 - 2012)

Bibliography

 Chi ha paura della muccassassina? Il mio mondo in discoteca e viceversa, Bompiani, 2007
 Le favole non dette, Bompiani, 2009
 Eldorado, Bompiani, 2011
 L'Italia migliore, Bompiani, 2013

Discography 

 Der Traurige, in Hey Roma! (Klang Records - klg 003 - 1989)

References

External links
 Vladimir Luxuria
 "Meglio fascista che frocio" A short passage of the video showing the quarrel between Mussolini and Luxuria.
  (as Vladimir Luxuria)
  (as Wladimiro Guadagno)

1965 births
People from Foggia
Living people
Transgender politicians
Communist Refoundation Party politicians
Transgender women
Italian actor-politicians
Italian transgender people
Italian LGBT rights activists
Survivor (franchise) winners
Participants in Italian reality television series
Italian LGBT actors
Winners in the Survivor franchise
LGBT legislators in Italy
Italian Roman Catholics
LGBT Christians
Christian communists
Transgender actresses